Marko Kutlić (born 18 May 1995) is a Croatian singer.

Music career

1995–2013: Early life
Marko Kutlić was born on 18 May 1995 in Slavonski Brod, Croatia. Kutlić moved with his family to Zagreb when he was 6 years old, where he started singing in church choirs. Later, he started uploading covers of popular song on his YouTube channel. His first recorded song was a cover of "Tears Don't Fall" by the British band Bullet for My Valentine. Kutlić recorded several more covers, of which the most popular was the rendition of Adele's "Someone like You".

2014–2017: Pravila igre
In 2014 the band Pravila igre was formed with Kutlić as the lead vocalist. In early 2015 the band released its debut single "Nebo na mojoj strani" which later topped the HR Top 40 chart in Croatia. The band's debut album Nebo na mojoj strani was released on 22 March 2017 through Croatia Records. Shortly after the album's release, Kutlić left the bend due to disagreements with the other members.

2018–present: Solo career
After parting ways with Pravila igre in 2017 Kutlić pursued a solo career. He released his first single as a lead artist "Srce se spasilo" in the second half of 2017. The song was written by Aleksandar Čubrilo, Marko Vojvodić and Igor Ivanović. On 22 November 2019 Kutlić released his debut studio album U kapi tvoje ljubavi. The album debuted and peaked at number 7 on the Croatian Albums Chart. On the 67th edition of the Zagreb Festival, Kutlić performed his song "Samo nek' ona sretna je", at the end of the competition he was announced as the winner. Later the song became his first solo number one single in Croatia.

Personal life
Kutlić is in a relationship with Croatian singer Antonela Đinđić.

Discography

Studio albums

Singles

References

External links

21st-century Croatian male singers
Living people
1995 births
Croatian pop singers
People from Slavonski Brod
Croatian pop musicians